Jude Attipetty is an Indian director of Malayalam cinema and television. He is the head of programs at Mazhavil Manorama and is the director of award-winning tele-series such as Sararanthal and Mikhayelinte Santhathikal. He has also received the Kerala State Television Award for direction for his series, Avasthantharangal.

Biography 
Born in Kochi, the business capital of the south Indian state of Kerala, Jude Attipetty started his career by making a documentary, Keep the City Clean for the Corporation of Kochi in 1981. Ten years later, he directed his first Malayalam tele-series, Sararanthal, which was aired on Doordarshan, which also brought him his first state award for direction. It was followed by Mikhayelinte Santhathikal in 1993, the debut series of Biju Menon, which again won the state award for best direction. The next series was Dr. Harischandra in 1994, and he made his film debut the same year with Puthran; the film was also the debut film of Biju Menon. His next film was Mercara, made in 1999, before which he also made a TV series, Roses in December in 1995. In 2001, he made another tele-series, Avasthantharangal, based on his earlier series, Mikhayelinte Santhathikal.

Attipetty made his first videofilm in 2002, Parayan Baki Vachathu, which was an official entry at the Second International Video Festival (IV Fest) held in 25 March 2003 at Thiruvananthapuram. The latest of his tele-series was Edayanum Mankidavum, telecast in 2003. He resides in Kochi and is associated with Mazhavil Manorama, heading its content development section as the chief of programs.

Awards

Oeuvre

See also 

 Bobby–Sanjay
 Abhirami
 P. F. Mathews

Notes

References

Further reading

External links 
 
 
 
 
 
 

People from Kochi
Malayalam film directors
Living people
Film directors from Kerala
Indian male film actors
21st-century Indian film directors
20th-century Indian film directors
Indian documentary film directors
1959 births